Leki Jackson-Bourke (born c. 1993) is a playwright based out of Auckland and is the first Pasifika playwright to win the Creative New Zealand Todd New Writer’s Bursary Grant in 2018.

Bourke is of Tongan-Niuean-Samoan ethnicity. In their youth, Bourke attended Marcellin College. Bourke then went to the Pacific Institute of Performing Arts and was pursuing a Bachelor in Pacific Performing Arts.

Bourke coauthored the play Inky Pinky Ponky with Amanaki Prescott-Faletau in 2015 and the play was published in 2017 in Talanoa: Four Pacific Plays, an anthology of four Pacific plays by Pasifika New Zealand Playwrights. In 2021, NZ on Air gave funding to Tikilounge Productions to make Inky Pinky Ponky into a series for Māori Television.

In 2017, Bourke won the Auckland Theatre Award for producing Maree Webster's Niuean parody Meet the Fakas where he was also named as one of the Outstanding Newcomers, along with Julie Zhu and Bronwyn Ensor. Meet the Fakas was awarded the Te Pou Theatre Award for Best Show Not Made by Pakeha (or Dirty D Word Award). In 2018, Bourke was awarded the Emerging Pacific Artist Award and $5,000 for the 2018 Creative New Zealand Arts Pasifika Awards. In 2019, Bourke was the first Victoria University Emerging Pasifika Writer in Residence Award. He wrote the play The Gangster's Paradise, which was selected as a joint winner in the teenage category for Playmarket New Zealand's 2019 Plays for the Young Competition along with Aroha Awarau's A Gaggle of Ducks . Bourke was also interviewed by the Ministry for Pacific Peoples about his journey as an artist the influence Niuean culture has on his work for 2019's and 2021's Niue Language Week.

Bourke did a placement at Q Theatre and Auckland Theatre Company with TAUTAI Contemporary Pasifika Arts.

Work

References 

Living people

1990s births
Year of birth uncertain
New Zealand dramatists and playwrights
New Zealand writers
New Zealand people